Kathryn Hackett King (born 1980) is a justice of the Arizona Supreme Court, sworn in on July 8, 2021. King served on the Arizona Board of Regents from 2020 to 2021.

Early life and education
King is a graduate of the Duke University where she received a bachelor's degree in political science and a Juris Doctor degree from University of Arizona School of Law in 2006. While attending the University of Arizona, King participated in the law college's secondary scholarly journal, the Arizona Journal of International and Comparative Law.

Career 

After law school, King clerked for Arizona Supreme Court Justice Michael D. Ryan before becoming an associate at Snell & Wilmer. In 2015, King became deputy general counsel to Governor Doug Ducey. In 2017, King became a partner at the woman-owned law firm Burns Barton, where she practiced employment law.

In March 2020, Ducey appointed King to the Arizona Board of Regents. She resigned in 2021.

In July 2021, Ducey appointed King to a seat on the Arizona Supreme Court, replacing Andrew Gould.

King's professional affiliations include membership to the Arizona Women Lawyers Association and the Federalist Society.

References

External links 
 Vacancy Application
 Burns Barton Profile
 Board of Regents Profile

1980 births
Living people
Place of birth missing (living people)
21st-century American judges
21st-century American women lawyers
21st-century American lawyers
Arizona Republicans
Duke University alumni
Federalist Society members
James E. Rogers College of Law alumni
Justices of the Arizona Supreme Court
21st-century American women judges